Almina Herbert, Countess of Carnarvon (née Wombwell; 14 April 1876 – 28 May 1969), was the wife of George Herbert, 5th Earl of Carnarvon, and châtelaine of Highclere Castle in Hampshire. After her second marriage, she became Mrs Almina Dennistoun, although she called herself Almina Carnarvon. It was her wealth that funded the search for Tutankhamun's tomb in Egypt.

Life
She was born Almina Victoria Maria Alexandra Wombwell, in Mayfair, London, the nominal child of Marie "Mina" Wombwell (née Boyer), the French wife of Captain Frederick Charles Wombwell, a businessman and retired British Army officer. However, her biological father was the banker Alfred de Rothschild, of the Rothschild family, who provided her with considerable wealth. This included a £500,000 trust on her marriage and, on Rothschild's death in 1918, £50,000 and his Mayfair house with its art collection, much of which she sold.

On 26 June 1895, aged 19, she married George Edward Stanhope Molyneux Herbert, 5th Earl of Carnarvon at St Margaret's, Westminster. The couple had two children:
 Henry Herbert, 6th Earl of Carnarvon (1898–1987), who married Anne Catherine Tredick Wendell and had one son, (the 7th Earl) and one daughter.

 Lady Evelyn Leonora Almina Herbert (1901–1980), who married Sir Brograve Campbell Beauchamp, 2nd Bt. and had a daughter.

At the beginning of the First World War, Lady Carnarvon opened a hospital for war wounded at Highclere Castle, helping with the organisation and assisting as a nurse. The hospital later moved to Mayfair in London. In 1919, Lady Carnarvon turned down an appointment as a Commander of the Order of the British Empire for her war work.

The Earl of Carnarvon developed an interest in Egyptology and became the financial backer of the search for Tutankhamun's tomb in the Valley of the Kings, Egypt, assisted by Almina's wealth. The Earl often wintered in Egypt. Almina accompanied him in the earlier years, but was not present in November 1922 at the opening of the newly discovered tomb.

In March 1923, Lady Carnarvon travelled to Egypt to join her husband, who was seriously ill with pneumonia. He died on 5 April 1923, and Almina returned to Britain with his body later that month. She continued to provide financial support for Carter's excavation of the tomb until 1925, when she reached a settlement with the Egyptian authorities whereby she gave up any claim on the contents of the tomb in return for £36,000 compensation.

The Carnarvons' only son, Henry Herbert (1898–1987), succeeded his father as sixth earl.

High Court case
In December 1923, eight months after Lord Carnarvon's death, Lady Carnarvon married Lieutenant Colonel Ian Onslow Dennistoun, a retired Grenadier Guards officer.

In 1925, Almina was involved in a much-publicised High Court case, known as the "Bachelor's Case", between Colonel Dennistoun and his former wife, Dorothy Dennistoun. When they had divorced, Dennistoun had been unable to pay ancillary relief and instead had promised he would provide for his ex-wife in the future, when he had funds. After hearing about Almina's wealth, Dorothy Dennistoun demanded the alimony she had been promised. Almina saw this as blackmail and persuaded her new husband to contest the claim in the courts, in what Sir Henry McCardie, who tried the case, called "the most bitterly conducted litigation I have ever known". A courtroom speech by Norman Birkett persuaded the jury to decide to disregard the agreement of Dennistoun to pay ancillary relief to his former wife.

Later life
After the death of Lord Carnarvon, Almina was provided with a house in the grounds of Highclere Castle, before she and Colonel Dennistoun moved to the Isle of Wight. Colonel Dennistoun, an asthmatic, often suffered from poor health and died in 1938. Almina then rented a house in Regent's Park in London, before moving in 1943 to a cottage near Minehead in Somerset. Although she received financial support from her son, she continued to live well above her means and faced mounting debts, and in 1951 she was declared bankrupt.

Almina sold her Somerset cottage and moved to a terraced house in Bristol, where she lived with her housekeeper and companion Anne Leadbetter. Almina died on 8 May 1969 aged 92 at the Frenchay Hospital, Bristol.

References

Sources

External links
 Highclere Castle, home of the Countess. Official website

1876 births
1969 deaths
Almina
British countesses
Rothschild family
People from Highclere